Rafi Khawar (Punjabi) (4 August 1942 – 2 June  1986), popularly known as Nanha (Urdu: ننھا), was a Pakistani actor and comedian. He started his film career in 1966 and earned several awards including 3 Nigar awards.

Career 
His first Urdu language film was Watan Ka Sipahi, released in 1966. Nanha got a breakthrough from film Noukar in 1976. He played the lead role in film Tehka Pehlwan in 1979, and in the same year his film Dubai Chalo was a super hit at the box office. His pairing with fellow comedian Ali Ejaz was popular since film Insaniyat (1967 film). Ali Ejaz and Nanha, as popular pair of comedians, were seen together in more than 50 films.

He was regarded as an exceptional comedy talent and for many years was the star of the widely popular Pakistan Television Corporation's TV show Alif Noon that ran for three television seasons during the early 1980s. He was a familiar face, well-known and loved by all. Nanha acted in Alif Noon with his fellow comedian Kamal Ahmed Rizvi better known as Allan in the TV show.

A supporting actress and a then popular film dancer named Nazli usually appeared with Nanha as his love interest in those movies. They were also often seen together in public and became romantically involved in real life. Nanha's success in films and celebrity status was at an all-time high. So money was never an issue with Nanha during his love affair with Nazli. He even pressured his film producers to cast Nazli with him in many films and the pair became inseparable in the early 1980s. This was not to last after Nanha's films started to flop and he fell on hard times financially. Then Nazli also started to lose interest in him.

Death

Certain mysterious circumstances reportedly and allegedly drove Nanha to commit suicide by shooting himself with a shotgun on 2 June 1986. 
His final resting place is in a cemetery located in Karim Block, Allama Iqbal Town, Lahore, Pakistan.

Filmography

Awards

See also 
 List of Lollywood actors

References

External links 
 

1944 births
1986 deaths
Pakistani male comedians
Pakistani male film actors
Pakistani male television actors
Punjabi people
Nigar Award winners
20th-century Pakistani male actors
20th-century comedians
Suicides by firearm in Pakistan